Košarkaški klub Radnik, commonly referred to as KK Radnik, is a men's basketball club based in Surdulica, Serbia. They are currently competing in the Second Basketball League of Serbia.

History 
The club won the First Regional League – East Division in the 2020–21 season and get qualified to the Second League of Serbia for the 2021–22 season.

Players 

  Ivan Saičić
  Andrija Simović

Head coaches 

  Milan Janjić (2019–2021)
  Perica Mitić (2021–2022)
  Vuk Lepojević (2022–present)

Trophies and awards

Trophies
 First Regional League, East Division (3rd-tier)
 Winners (1): 2020–21

See also 
 FK Radnik Surdulica

References

External links
 Profile at eurobasket.com
 Profile at srbijasport.net 
 

Radnik
Radnik
Radnik
Sport in Southern and Eastern Serbia